Mugnaini is an Italian surname. Notable people with the surname include:

Ginevra Mugnaini (born 1973), Italian tennis player
Guido Marcello Mugnaini (born 1940), Italian cyclist
Joseph Mugnaini (1912–1992), Italian-born American artist and illustrator

Italian-language surnames